Herculanus can refer to:

St. Herculanus of Brescia
St. Herculanus of Perugia (Sant' Ercolano)
St. Herculanus of Piegaro
Sts. Taurinus and Herculanus, martyrs of Ostia in the 5th century, see Basilica of Saint Paul Outside the Walls
Flavius Bassus Herculanus, a senator betrothed to Justa Grata Honoria

See also
Ercolano
Herculaneum